Alita: Battle Angel is a 2019 American cyberpunk action film based on Yukito Kishiro's manga series Gunnm (or Battle Angel Alita in English). It was directed by Robert Rodriguez, produced by James Cameron and Jon Landau, and written by Cameron and Laeta Kalogridis. Rosa Salazar stars through motion-capture animation as Alita, a cyborg who awakens in a new body without memory of her past and sets out to uncover her destiny. Christoph Waltz, Jennifer Connelly, Mahershala Ali, Ed Skrein, Jackie Earle Haley and Keean Johnson star in supporting roles.

Announced in 2003, production was repeatedly delayed due to Cameron's work on Avatar (2009) and its sequels. After years of development hell, Rodriguez was announced as Alita's director in April 2016, with Salazar cast as the lead the following month. Principal photography began in October 2016 in Austin, Texas, mostly at Rodriguez's Troublemaker Studios, and lasted until February 2017.

Alita: Battle Angel had its world premiere at the Odeon Leicester Square in London on January 31, 2019, and was released in Hong Kong, Indonesia, Macau, Malaysia, Singapore, South Korea, and Taiwan on February 5, 2019, marking Chinese New Year. It was released in the United States on February 14, 2019, by 20th Century Fox in RealD 3D, Dolby Cinema, 4DX, ScreenX, and IMAX 3D formats. It is the first film produced by Lightstorm Entertainment since Avatar, and the last film released by 20th Century Fox before the acquisition of 21st Century Fox by Disney. The film grossed over $405 million worldwide, making it Rodriguez's highest-grossing film, and received praise from critics for its action sequences, visual effects, and Salazar's performance, while the screenplay was criticized.

Plot 
In 2563, 300 years after Earth was devastated by a catastrophic war known as "The Fall", scientist Dr. Dyson Ido discovers a disembodied female cyborg with an intact human brain while scavenging for parts in the massive scrapyard of Iron City. Ido attaches a new cyborg body to the brain and names her "Alita" after his deceased daughter. Alita wakes with no memory of her past and quickly befriends Hugo, a young man who dreams of moving to the wealthy sky city of Zalem. She also meets Dr. Chiren, Ido's estranged ex-wife. Hugo later introduces Alita to Motorball, a Rollerball-like racing sport played by cyborg gladiators. Secretly, Hugo robs cyborgs of their parts for Vector, owner of the Motorball tournament and the 'de facto' ruler of the Factory, Iron City's governing authority.

One night, Alita follows Ido; they are ambushed by a gang of cyborg serial killers led by Grewishka. Ido is injured, and Alita instinctively fights using "Panzer-Kunst", a lost combat art for machine bodies. She kills two of the cyborgs and damages Grewishka, who retreats. Ido reveals that he is a Hunter-Warrior, a bounty hunter hired by the Factory. Grewishka goes to Dr. Chiren, who is working for Vector, for help. Despite Alita believing that fighting will help her rediscover her past, Ido discourages her from becoming a Hunter-Warrior. Alita finds a highly advanced cyborg body in a crashed spaceship outside the city. Recognizing that the body belonged to a Berserker—deadly shock troops of the enemy nation United Republics of Mars (URM) from the Fall, of which Alita was a member—Ido refuses to install Alita in it.

Frustrated, Alita registers herself as a Hunter-Warrior. At the Kansas Bar, she and Hugo are unable to recruit other Hunter-Warriors to help her take down Grewishka. Zapan, a cyborg Hunter-Warrior bully, provokes Alita, and she severely beats him in a fight, triggering a chaotic bar brawl until Ido arrives to intervene. Suddenly, an upgraded Grewishka appears and challenges Alita to a duel, revealing that he has been sent by Zalem's technocrat overlord, Nova, to destroy her. Despite her combat skills, Alita's body is damaged by Grewishka, before Ido, Hugo and Hunter-Warrior dogmaster McTeague arrive and force Grewishka to retreat. Ido apologizes and transplants Alita into the Berserker body.

Having fallen in love with Hugo, Alita enters a Motorball tryout race for the prize money to send Hugo to Zalem. Hugo's relationship with Alita leads him to decide to quit his criminal job. He confronts his partner Tanji, but Zapan appears, kills Tanji and frames Hugo for the murder of another cyborg. Hugo narrowly escapes and calls Alita for help; she abandons the race and finds him just as Zapan does. Zapan mortally wounds Hugo. Dr. Chiren, having changed her mind about working for Vector, offers to help save Hugo by attaching his severed head to Alita's life support system. When Zapan sees through the trick and attempts to stop Alita, she seizes his prized Damascus blade and disfigures him.

Ido transplants Hugo's head onto a cyborg body and tells Alita that Vector's offer to help Hugo reach Zalem was a lie; as an exiled citizen of Zalem, Ido is certain that citizens of Iron City cannot enter Zalem without becoming a motorball champion. Alita storms the Factory and confronts Vector, who reveals that Chiren has been harvested for her organs. Vector summons Grewishka, but Alita's new nanotech body allows her to easily destroy him. She forces Nova to speak to her through Vector. When Nova threatens to harm her friends, Alita fatally impales Vector.

Ido tells Alita that Hugo has fled to climb a cargo tube towards Zalem. Alita catches up to him and pleads with him to return with her. He eventually agrees, but a serrated defense ring dropped by Nova shreds his body and throws him off the tube. Alita catches him but cannot pull him up. Hugo thanks Alita for saving him before falling to his death.

Months later, Alita is a rising superstar in the Motorball tournament. Cheered on by the crowd, she pledges vengeance by pointing her plasma-charged sword toward Zalem, where Nova watches from above, smirking.

Cast 

 Rosa Salazar as Alita, a revived cyborg suffering from amnesia
 Christoph Waltz as Dr. Dyson Ido, a renowned cyborg scientist, part-time bounty hunter and Alita's father figure
 Jennifer Connelly as Dr. Chiren, Ido's estranged former wife, a masterful cyborg engineer who works for Vector
 Mahershala Ali as Vector, an influential entrepreneur at the Factory with criminal connections who also serves as Nova's proxy
 Ed Skrein as Zapan, an arrogant sword-wielding bounty-hunting cyborg who develops an egotistic vendetta against Alita
 Jackie Earle Haley as Grewishka, a huge criminal cyborg who works for Nova as his personal assassin and enforcer
 Keean Johnson as Hugo, Alita's love interest and a morally conflicted scrap dealer
 Jorge Lendeborg Jr. as Tanji, Hugo's scrap-dealing friend and accomplice in crime who is more underhanded and does not share Hugo's ethics
 Lana Condor as Koyomi, a teenager who is friends with Hugo and Tanji
 Idara Victor as Nurse Gerhad, Ido's assistant
 Jeff Fahey as McTeague, a Hunter-Warrior who leads a pack of cyborg dogs
 Eiza González as Nyssiana, a wanted criminal cyborg assassin and one of Grewishka's subordinates
 Derek Mears as Romo, a wanted criminal cyborg assassin and one of Grewishka's subordinates
 Leonard Wu as Kinuba, a top league Motorball player whose limbs were cut off by Hugo's jacking gang
 Rick Yune as Master Clive Lee, a Hunter-Warrior who claims a record of 207 kills
 Casper Van Dien as Amok, a cyborg who is responsible for the death of Ido's daughter
 Elle LaMont as Screwhead, a cyborg who's referred to as being one of the most lethal Hunter-Warriors hired by the Factory 
Michelle Rodriguez plays Alita's cyborg mentor Gelda, Jai Courtney cameos as Motorball champion Jashugan, and Edward Norton has a cameo as Nova. All three are uncredited.

Production

Development 
Battle Angel Alita, an early-1990s Japanese cyberpunk manga series written by Yukito Kishiro, was originally brought to James Cameron's attention by filmmaker Guillermo del Toro, and Cameron immediately became enamored with the concept. The domain name "battleangelalita.com" was registered to James Cameron by 20th Century Fox around June 2000. Fox also registered the "battleangelmovie.com" domain. In April 2003, it was reported by Moviehole that Cameron had confirmed he would direct a Battle Angel film. Cameron confirmed that a script for the film was in production during an interview on the Tokudane! program on Fuji TV on May 4, 2003. It was originally scheduled to be his next production after the TV series Dark Angel, which was influenced by Battle Angel Alita. It was later scheduled to be his next film after Aliens of the Deep in January 2005.

In June 2005, The Hollywood Reporter claimed that the film was being delayed while Cameron developed a film known as Project 880, which would later be renamed Avatar. Entertainment Weekly ran an interview in February 2006 in which Cameron stated that his deal with 20th Century Fox was that he produce both films. The article also claimed that Battle Angel was slated to be released in September 2009. In June 2006, Cameron commented that Battle Angel was the second of two planned film trilogies he was developing, with the first being Avatar. In May 2008, Cameron indicated he would be working on a film titled The Dive, a biography of freedivers Francisco Ferreras and Audrey Mestre, thus delaying the film again. That July, at the San Diego Comic-Con International, he reiterated that he was still committed to making the film. In December 2009, Cameron commented during an interview with MTV News that a script for Battle Angel had been completed.

In February 2010, producer Jon Landau commented that he was trying to convince Cameron to change the title from the manga to Alita: Battle Angel for the film. Cameron later explained the reason for rearranging the film title from the initial source material, was to allow the possibilities of sequel titles, "It's Alita, colon, Battle Angel. Because the next one will be "Alita: Fallen Angel" and then Alita... you know "Avenging Angel" and then Alita whatever. I mean, that's assuming we make some money". Landau also revealed that screenwriter Laeta Kalogridis had worked on writing the film. In August 2010, Cameron stated that the film was "still on [his] radar", but he did not know when he would make it. However, that October, he confirmed that his next films would be two Avatar sequels instead of Battle Angel. He still stated that he did not intend to abandon the film, stating that he loved the project too much to hand it off to another director, but reiterated in June 2011 that it would not be produced until the two Avatar sequels were completed, stating that "Battle Angel is not going to happen for a few years". According to Cameron, his reason for producing Avatar first is because he believes that the film can raise public awareness of the need for environmental protection.

During an interview with Alfonso Cuarón in July 2013, Cameron set 2017 as the date at which production on the film would begin. In October 2015, The Hollywood Reporter reported that director Robert Rodriguez was in negotiations to direct the film, now titled Alita: Battle Angel, and Cameron would be attached as producer alongside Jon Landau. Rodriguez had been brought in by Cameron to condense and combine Cameron's 186-page screenplay and some 600 pages of notes into what could be the shooting script. Satisfied by Rodriguez's work on the shooting script, Cameron offered him the directing job. In April 2016, The Hollywood Reporter reported that 20th Century Fox had not yet greenlit the film, as they were attempting to reduce the budget to something below $175–$200 million. The article also announced that Rodriguez had been signed as director. In late May 2016, Fox scheduled the film for a July 20, 2018 release date.

Pre-production 
With James Cameron as potential director, the film was to be produced with the same mix of live-action and computer-generated imagery that Cameron used in Avatar. Specifically, Cameron intended to render the main character, Alita, completely in CGI. Cameron had stated that he would make use of technologies developed for Avatar to produce the film, such as the Fusion Camera System, facial performance capture, and the Simulcam. In May 2006, Variety reported that Cameron had spent the past ten months developing technology to produce the film.

In October 2018, Mark Goerner, a digital artist who had worked on the film for a year and a half, commented that pre-production work on the film was mostly finished. In a February 2019 interview, Cameron revealed that he set the floating city of Zalem in Panama, specifically Panama City. He explained that the city Zalem is not floating, but hanging from a space elevator, which would only work physically near the equator. As a result of the new location, Iron City was designed with Spanish signage and Latin American architecture.

Casting
An April 2016 article in The Hollywood Reporter reported that Maika Monroe, Rosa Salazar, and Zendaya were among the final actresses being considered to take the role of Alita in the film, with a decision due within a few weeks. The article reported that Zendaya's former Shake It Up co-star Bella Thorne had also auditioned for the role. Near the end of May 2016, Collider reported that Salazar had been chosen. In August 2016, it was reported that Christoph Waltz was in negotiations to play Dr. Dyson Ido, the equivalent of Daisuke Ido from the original manga. On September 14, 2016, it was announced that Jackie Earle Haley had been cast as a cyborg villain. On September 21, 2016, Variety reported that Ed Skrein was in talks for a role in the film; The Hollywood Reporter later confirmed that he had been cast as the antagonist Zapan.

On September 30, 2016, Keean Johnson was reported to have been cast in the film to play Hugo, Alita's love interest, who later becomes the reason for her to play a gladiator-style game called Motorball. The studio also considered Avan Jogia, Douglas Booth, Jack Lowden, and Noah Silver for the role, but decided on Johnson because they were looking for someone more "ethnically ambiguous". On October 3, 2016, Mahershala Ali was reportedly in talks for the villainous role of Vector, a man who rigs Motorball combat matches. In an interview following his Best Supporting Actor win at the 89th Academy Awards, Ali revealed that he would play two roles in the film, although he did not elaborate on the nature of the second role.

On October 5, 2016, it was reported that Eiza González had joined the film. González is one of the leads in Rodriguez's television series From Dusk till Dawn: The Series. Jorge Lendeborg Jr. was announced for a role in the film on October 7, 2016. He would play Hugo's friend. Lana Condor was reported to have joined the cast on October 11, 2016, portraying the orphaned teen Koyomi. On October 18, 2016, Leonard Wu was cast as the cyborg Kinuba. Marko Zaror joined the cast as the cyborg Ajakutty in December 2016. On February 7, 2017, Jennifer Connelly joined the film in an unknown villainous role. Michelle Rodriguez was retroactively announced for a role on February 22, 2017, after the film had completed shooting.

Filming 
The film began shooting at Robert Rodriguez's Troublemaker Studios in Austin, Texas on October 17, 2016, and concluded on February 9, 2017. In late January 2017, a casting call went out looking for rocker, punk, or emo extras to film scenes in Austin on the nights of February 3, 6 and 7, 2017.

Visual effects 
The visual effects were provided by Weta Digital, DNEG and Framestore and supervised by Joe Letteri, Eric Saindon, Nick Epstein, Raymond Chen and Nigel Denton-Howes. Weta Digital was the primary vendor for the Alita digital puppet, which required the company to redesign its motion capture methods to capture all the subtleties and complexities of Salazar's performance.

Music 

On December 17, 2018, it was announced that English-Albanian singer Dua Lipa would have a song featured on the film's soundtrack titled "Swan Song". The song and official music video were released on January 24, 2019, with the official music video directed by Floria Sigismondi. Tom Holkenborg composed the score for the film as well as the song "Swan Song" as a co-writer. The soundtrack album for the film was released digitally on February 14, 2019 by Milan Records, with a physical release, the following day.

Marketing 
The teaser trailer for the film was released on December 8, 2017, with a July 2018 release in mind. The footage received a mixed response, with a majority of the commentary focusing on the appearance of the titular character, Alita. Andrew Liptak of The Verge stated that "The character looks like an anime doll come to life, or like a Disney character that's just a hair off from normal. It's probably a deliberate choice, meant to remind viewers at every moment that Alita isn't human. But after so many years of CGI animators trying to mimic convincing human faces and not entirely succeeding, it's still unsettling to see a character hovering this close to realistic, while staying this far away from it." Adam Chitwood of Collider was intrigued and cautiously optimistic, saying, "This thing looks bonkers, and now it's crystal clear why Cameron was considering directing this in the first place. The choice to make your protagonist a photo-real CGI creation interacting with actual human characters is mighty ambitious, and I can say with certainty this doesn't look like anything Robert Rodriguez has done before. I don't know if it'll be good, but it definitely seems like it'll at least be interesting."

The first trailer was shown at SDCC 2018 and made its way online on July 23, 2018, with a December 2018 release in mind. The trailer featured a cover of Linkin Park's "New Divide", covered by composer J2 featuring vocalist Avery. The third trailer was released in November 2018, almost a year after the first trailer was launched.

A tie-in novel was released on November 20, 2018, written by sci-fi author Pat Cadigan. Entitled Iron City, the novel's story acted as a prequel focused on some of the residents living in Iron City before the events of the film. An audiobook adaptation of the novel was also released on the same date, narrated by Brian Nishii. Alongside the release of the film, another novel titled Dr. Ido's Journal by Nick Aires was published on February 19, 2019. Three hundred limited-edition copies of The Art and Making of the Movie by Abbie Bernstein were signed by Robert Rodriguez. The official novelization of the film was released on the same date, written by Pat Cadigan.

In January 2019, Cameron and 20th Century Fox partnered with Open Bionics to give 13-year-old double amputee Tilly Lockey a pair of Alita-inspired bionic Hero Arms for the film's London premiere. In February 2019, 20th Century Fox collaborated with Iam8bit to create "Passport to Iron City", a recreation of the film's setting for fans to tour. "Passport to Iron City" is available in New York City, Los Angeles, and Austin.

Release

Theatrical 
The film held its world premiere on January 31, 2019, at the Odeon Leicester Square in London, and was released by 20th Century Fox in the United States on February 14, 2019, in standard, 3D, Dolby Cinema, 4DX, ScreenX and IMAX 3D formats. It was originally set to be released on July 20, 2018, but in February 2018, the film was delayed to December 21 before later being pushed back again in late September to its final release date, with a PG-13 cut of Deadpool 2 taking its place.

On January 28, 2019, Cameron announced that the film would hold free one-day previews in the United States on January 31, 2019, before the general release. It was also released in Hong Kong, Indonesia, Macau, Malaysia, Singapore, South Korea, and Taiwan on February 5, 2019, marking Chinese New Year. the Philippines on February 6, India on February 8, and Japan and Mainland China on February 22. It is also notable for being the final film from Fox to be released as a stand alone studio, as a month later on March 20, 2019, the studio was acquired by The Walt Disney Company and would distribute future films under them starting with the release of Breakthrough.

Lawsuit 
On January 30, 2019, Epic Stone Group, a Florida-based multimedia company, sued 20th Century Fox for trademark infringement over the "Battle Angel" name. The lawsuit claims that Epic Stone Group had filed the trademark for "Battle Angel" in 2009 for computer games, action figures and other merchandise, and it had filed a new application in April 2018 to use the name on DVDs, e-books, films and television programs. On May 30, 2019, Epic Stone Group filed to dismiss their trademark infringement suit against 20th Century Fox with prejudice.

Home media 
Alita: Battle Angel was released by 20th Century Fox Home Entertainment on digital platforms on July 9, 2019, with Blu-ray, 4K Ultra HD and DVD releases following on July 23. The 4K version was Fox's first 4K release to utilize Dolby Vision (alongside rival format HDR10+ on the same disc; Fox had already released films in that format and was a backer) and includes a bonus 3D version of the film on a separate disc.

It was a hit on home video, topping the Blu-ray charts for two weeks in a row, . , it has grossed at least  in home video sales.

Reception

Box office 
It is Robert Rodriguez's highest-grossing film. Estimates vary for the total worldwide gross the film needed in order to break even, with Fox insiders stating  but outside financial publications pegging the amount at $400500 million. Some contend the film broke even by the end of its theatrical run, others listed its losses as high as $53 million.

North America 
In the United States and Canada, the film was initially projected to gross $18–22 million in its opening weekend, and around $25 million from 3,790 theaters over its first four days. After making $8.7 million on its first day (including $2.4 million from Wednesday night previews), five-day projections were increased to $36–40 million. It then made $7.5 million on its second day of release and went on to debut to $28.5 million in the weekend, finishing first at the box office. Opening weekend audiences consisted of 60% male and 40% female, with demographics including 44% White, 21% Hispanic, 15% Asian American and 14% African American. The film dropped 58% in its second weekend, making $12 million and finishing second behind newcomer How to Train Your Dragon: The Hidden World, and then made $7 million in its third, finishing third.

Other territories 
Alita opened a week early in 11 international markets (including ten Asian countries as well as the United Kingdom), where it grossed  in its opening weekend. It was the weekend's second-highest-grossing film with $84 million worldwide, behind the Chinese film The Wandering Earth.

In China, Alita earned  from early midnight previews prior to release. Chinese opening weekend audiences consisted of 54% male and 46% female. The film also topped the worldwide box office that weekend with $104.4 million.

Critical response 
The website's critical consensus reads, "Alita: Battle Angels story struggles to keep up with its special effects, but fans of futuristic sci-fi action may still find themselves more than sufficiently entertained." On Metacritic, the film has a weighted average score of 53 out of 100, based on 49 critics, indicating "mixed or average reviews". Audiences polled by CinemaScore gave the film an average grade of "A−" on an A+ to F scale, while those at PostTrak gave it an overall positive score of 78% and a 59% "definite recommend".

Michael Nordine of IndieWire gave the film a grade of "B+", saying, "Alita: Battle Angel is [Rodriguez's] best film since he brought Frank Miller's graphic novel to the screen, a sci-fi epic that does something rare in an age of endless adaptations and reboots: lives up to its potential while leaving you wanting more." Writing for Variety, Guy Lodge praised Rodriguez's effort but called the film "muddled" and wrote: "This manga-based cyberpunk origin story is a pretty zappy effects showcase, weighed down by a protracted, soul-challenged Frankenstory that short-circuits every time it gets moving." Monica Castillo from RogerEbert.com wrote that the "visual bonanza cooked up by Rodriguez, cinematographer Bill Pope and editors Stephen E. Rivkin and Ian Silverstein is enough to power through any narrative bumps with quickly paced action and bleak, yet colorful, imagery" and gave the film 2.5 out of 4. Emily Yoshida of New York magazine was critical of the film but ultimately found it charming, and praised Salazar's performance "The only reason any of this works at all is Salazar and, I hate to say it, those goddamned big eyes. They're the windows to the soul, after all, and this ungainly, lurching cyborg of a would-be blockbuster has more of that than meets the eye."

Accolades 
In addition to the numerous awards and nominations, Alita: Battle Angel was submitted for consideration in the Best Visual Effects category at the 92nd Academy Awards, but failed to get shortlisted.

Planned sequels 
James Cameron and Robert Rodriguez have hinted that the film could lead to multiple sequels. On February 6, 2019, they announced that they have plans for Alita: Battle Angel 2 in the future. The casting of Edward Norton in a non-speaking role as Nova in this film was intended to be a setup for the sequel. Additionally, the uncredited cameos by Michelle Rodriguez and Jai Courtney were meant to set up larger roles in a sequel.

In April 2020, Christoph Waltz stated that he had not heard any discussions about a potential sequel to the film, and thought the possibility was unlikely following Disney's acquisition of 20th Century Fox as it may not fit in with the Disney culture. However, in January 2021, the director Robert Rodriguez said that he was hoping that a sequel to the film would be made. Later on, during an interview with "The Nerdy Basement", Rodriguez claimed that he would try pitching an Alita sequel if The Book of Boba Fett series, directed by him, succeeded in "knock[ing] people's socks off". In December 2022, Rodriguez and Cameron took a virtual blood oath to make a sequel.

Legacy
In September 2020, a social media campaign took place with fans petitioning for U.S. cinema chain Cinemark to re-release the film in theaters before the end of the year as a way to gauge public interest in a potential sequel. Cinemark quickly responded stating that they were considering it. On October 7, James Cameron confirmed that the film would indeed be returning to select theaters on October 30 while voicing support for #AlitaArmy. Director Robert Rodriguez also voiced his support for the movement. Regal Cinemas and AMC Theatres also confirmed that the film would be shown in their theaters before the former announced the temporary closure of their locations due to diminishing returns as a result of the COVID-19 pandemic. The film was re-released in theatres on October 30, 2020.

About the film's reception, Rodriguez said, "The fans still didn't let anyone forget that they loved that movie. It's almost better than having a movie that does really well but no one remembers in 6 to 8 years."

References

Literature 
 2018: Pat Cadigan: Alita: Battle Angel - Iron City (Prequel-Novel), Titan Books, 
 2019: Pat Cadigan: Alita: Battle Angel - The Official Movie Novelization, Titan Books, 
 2019: Abbie Bernstein: Alita: Battle Angel - The Art and Making of the Movie, Titan Books,

External links 
 
 
 

2019 films
2010s coming-of-age films
2019 science fiction action films
20th Century Fox films
Troublemaker Studios films
TSG Entertainment films
American coming-of-age films
American films with live action and animation
American science fiction action films
American robot films
2010s English-language films
Battle Angel
Cyberpunk films
Cyborg films
American dystopian films
Films about amnesia
Films directed by Robert Rodriguez
Films produced by James Cameron
Films produced by Jon Landau
Films set in the 26th century
Films scored by Junkie XL
Films shot in Austin, Texas
Films with screenplays by James Cameron
Films with screenplays by Laeta Kalogridis
IMAX films
Lightstorm Entertainment films
Live-action films based on manga
Martial arts science fiction films
Films using motion capture
American post-apocalyptic films
Transhumanism in film
Roller skating films
Films about competitions
Films about death games
2019 3D films
ScreenX films
4DX films
2010s American films